Caladenia exstans,  commonly known as the pointing spider orchid, is a species of orchid endemic to a small area in the south-west of Western Australia. It has a single, hairy leaf and one or two green, yellow and red flowers with a labellum which does not curl downwards but "points" forward.

Description 
The sepals have thin, yellowish glandular tips. It is greenish-yellow with a dark reddish-purple tip which is not curled under but points forward. The edges of the labellum are smooth and there are four or more rows of deep red calli along its centre. Flowering occurs from September to early November.

The cryptic colouration of this orchid and the relatively small flower on a long stem make this orchid difficult to find but it is the only greenish spider orchid with a smooth-edged labellum occurring east of Esperance.

Taxonomy and naming 
Caladenia exstans was first described by Stephen Hopper and Andrew Brown in 2001 from a specimen collected near Esperance. The description was published in Nuytsia. The specific epithet (exstans) is a Latin word meaning "projecting" referring to the pointed labellum.

Distribution and habitat 
Pointing spider orchid is found between Esperance and Israelite Bay in the Esperance Plains biogeographic region where it grows in swamp yate forest and in shallow soil on and near granite outcrops.

Conservation
Caladenia exstans is classified as "not threatened" by the Western Australian Government Department of Parks and Wildlife.

References

External links 

exstans
Orchids of Western Australia
Endemic orchids of Australia
Plants described in 2001
Endemic flora of Western Australia
Taxa named by Stephen Hopper
Taxa named by Andrew Phillip Brown